Edward James McMurray  (June 4, 1878 – April 20, 1969) was a Canadian politician.

Born in Thorndale, Ontario, he was elected to the House of Commons of Canada in the Manitoba riding of Winnipeg North in the 1921 federal election. A Liberal, he was defeated in 1925. From 1923 to 1925, he was the Solicitor General of Canada.

References

Further reading
 

1878 births
1969 deaths
Liberal Party of Canada MPs
Members of the House of Commons of Canada from Manitoba
Members of the King's Privy Council for Canada
Solicitors General of Canada
Canadian King's Counsel